Mardian is a surname. Notable people with the surname include:

Robert Mardian (1923–2006), American government official
Sam Mardian (1919–2015), American businessman and politician

See also
Amardi